Corticomis is a genus of moths of the family Anthelidae first described by Van Eecke in 1924.

Species
 Corticomis eupterotioides Van Eecke, 1924
 Corticomis marmorea Van Eecke, 1924

References

Anthelidae